The 1956 United States presidential election in South Dakota took place on November 6, 1956, as part of the 1956 United States presidential election. Voters chose four representatives, or electors, to the Electoral College, who voted for president and vice president.

South Dakota was won by incumbent President Dwight D. Eisenhower (R–Pennsylvania), running with Vice President Richard Nixon, with 58.39 percent of the popular vote, against Adlai Stevenson (D–Illinois), running with Tennessee Senator Estes Kefauver, with 41.61% of the popular vote.

Results

Results by county

See also
 United States presidential elections in South Dakota

Notes

References

South Dakota
1956
1956 South Dakota elections